August 22 - Eastern Orthodox liturgical calendar - August 24

All fixed commemorations below are observed on September 5 by Eastern Orthodox Churches on the Old Calendar.

For August 23, Orthodox Churches on the Old Calendar commemorate the Saints listed on August 10.

Feasts

 Apodosis of the Dormition.

Saints

 Hieromartyr Pothinus, Bishop of Lyons (ca. 177)
 Hieromartyr Irenaeus, Bishop of Lyons (202)
 Hieromartyr Irenaeus, Bishop of Sirmium in Hungary (304)  (see also: March 26)
 Martyrs Severus, Memnon the Centurion, and 38 others, of Thrace (ca. 305)  (see also: August 20)
 Martyr Lupus of Novae (306), slave of St. Demetrius of Thessaloniki.  (see also: October 26)
 Saints Eutychius (540) and Florentius (547) of Nursia.
 Saint Callinicus, Patriarch of Constantinople (705)
 Saint Anthony, Bishop of Sardis (10th century)
 Saint Nicholas the Sicilian, ascetic of Mt. Neotaka in Euboea.

Pre-Schism Western saints

 Martyrs Quiriacus, Maximus Archelaus and Companions (c. 235)
 Martyrs Minervius, Eleazar and Companions, in Lyons in France - eight children are included in their number (3rd century) 
 Saint Tydfil, venerated in Merthyr Tydfil in Wales, where she was slain by the heathen (c. 480)
 Saint Victor of Vita (Victor Vitensis), born in Carthage in North Africa, he was either Bishop there or in Utica (c. 535)
 Saint Éogan of Ardstraw (c. 618)
 Saints Flavian (Flavinian, Flavius) of Autun, the twenty-first Bishop of Autun in France (7th century)
 Saints Altigianus and Hilarinus, two monks killed by the Saracens at Saint-Seine in France (731)
 Martyrs Æbbe the Younger, Abbess of Coldingham Priory, Northumbria, and her companions (870)

Post-Schism Orthodox saints

 Saint Haralambos of Panagia Kalyviani convent (in the Heraklio Prefecture), the newly-revealed (1788)

New martyrs and confessors

 New Hieromartyrs Ephraim (Kuznetsov), Bishop of Selenginsk, and John Vostorgov, Archpriest, of Moscow, and Martyr Nicholas Varzhansky (1918)
 New Hieromartyrs Paul Gaidai and John Karabanov, Priests (1937)

Other commemorations

 Synaxis of Panagia Proussiotissa (Mother of God of Proussa) in Evrytania, Greece (c. 829–842)
 Mykhaylivska Icon of the Most Holy Theotokos.
 Repose of Abbot Ioannicius (Moroi) of Sihastria, Romania (1944)

Icon gallery

Notes

References

Sources
 August 23 / September 5. Orthodox Calendar (PRAVOSLAVIE.RU).
 September 5 / August 23. Holy Trinity Russian Orthodox Church (A parish of the Patriarchate of Moscow).
 August 23. OCA - The Lives of the Saints.
 The Autonomous Orthodox Metropolia of Western Europe and the Americas (ROCOR). St. Hilarion Calendar of Saints for the year of our Lord 2004. St. Hilarion Press (Austin, TX). p. 62.
 The Twenty-Third Day of the Month of August. Orthodoxy in China.
 August 23. Latin Saints of the Orthodox Patriarchate of Rome.
 The Roman Martyrology. Transl. by the Archbishop of Baltimore. Last Edition, According to the Copy Printed at Rome in 1914. Revised Edition, with the Imprimatur of His Eminence Cardinal Gibbons. Baltimore: John Murphy Company, 1916. pp. 254–255.
 Rev. Richard Stanton. A Menology of England and Wales, or, Brief Memorials of the Ancient British and English Saints Arranged According to the Calendar, Together with the Martyrs of the 16th and 17th Centuries. London: Burns & Oates, 1892. pp. 410–411.

 Greek Sources
 Great Synaxaristes:  23 ΑΥΓΟΥΣΤΟΥ. ΜΕΓΑΣ ΣΥΝΑΞΑΡΙΣΤΗΣ.
  Συναξαριστής. 23 Αυγούστου. ECCLESIA.GR. (H ΕΚΚΛΗΣΙΑ ΤΗΣ ΕΛΛΑΔΟΣ).

 Russian Sources
  5 сентября (23 августа). Православная Энциклопедия под редакцией Патриарха Московского и всея Руси Кирилла (электронная версия). (Orthodox Encyclopedia - Pravenc.ru).

August in the Eastern Orthodox calendar